Diney is a nickname. It may refer to:

 Diney (footballer, born 1991), Valdisney Costa dos Santos, Brazilian football midfielder
 Diney (footballer, born 1995), Edilson Alberto Monteiro Sanches Borges, Cape Verdean football centre-back

See also
 Dinei (disambiguation)
 Diné